Naungyin may refer to:

Naungyin, Shwegu, a village in Kachin State, Burma
Naungyin, Homalin, a village in Sagaing Region, Burma
Naungyin, Lawksawk, a village in Shan State, Burma